Stoke Mandeville railway station serves the village of Stoke Mandeville, south of Aylesbury in Buckinghamshire, England. The station is on the London - Aylesbury line and is served by Chiltern Railways trains.

Both station platforms have step-free access.

History

The station was opened on 1 September 1892, by the Metropolitan Railway (Met), when its main line was extended from Chalfont Road to Aylesbury Town. The Great Central Railway served the station from 1899, connecting the station to Leicester, Nottingham, and Sheffield.

When London Underground's Metropolitan line (the successor of the Met) was fully electrified in the late 1950s and early 1960s, a decision was made to run only as far as Amersham. This meant that Stoke Mandeville was henceforth now only served by main line services; following the end of steam-hauled Metropolitan line trains in 1961 the service was provided by British Rail Class 115 diesel multiple units until 1992 (which were then replaced by the line's current rolling stock which, at this station, mainly consists of Class 165 and Class 168 rolling stock). Responsibility for the station (and the railway north of Amersham to Aylesbury) was transferred from London Transport to British Railways on 11 September 1961; British Railways signage gradually replaced that of the London Underground.

In 1966 as a result of the Reshaping of British Railways report, the line north of Aylesbury was closed and the station is now only served by local commuter services. Services were run by British Rail until privatisation in 1996, when Chiltern Railways took over the franchise.

During the modernisation of the Met in the 1950s, the down (Aylesbury) platform buildings were demolished. In 1989-90 BR's Network SouthEast refurbished the station and the "up" (London) platform canopy was shortened slightly.

The lawn at the station front features several sculptures including a statue of a former employee.

Services
At peak times there are up to 4 trains per hour to London in the morning, and from London (to Aylesbury) in the evening. Some are express services, which omit the stops shared with the Metropolitan line nearer to London.

Journeys to Marylebone take about 55 minutes or 45 minutes for express trains, of which there is one per day. Journeys to Aylesbury take about 5 minutes.

The off-peak service pattern is as follows:
2 trains per hour to Aylesbury
1 train per hour continues on to Aylesbury Vale Parkway
2 trains per hour to London Marylebone

Onward connections
For Stoke Mandeville Hospital, rail passengers should alight at Aylesbury and take the Red Route 9 or No 300 (Aylesbury to High Wycombe) bus from Aylesbury Bus Station which is located 300yds from the railway station at Aylesbury.

Buses run by Arriva Shires & Essex link Stoke Mandeville station with Aylesbury and Leighton Buzzard.

References

External links

 Chiltern Railways
 Photos of Stoke Mandeville Station

Metropolitan line stations
Railway stations in Buckinghamshire
Former Metropolitan and Great Central Joint Railway stations
Railway stations in Great Britain opened in 1892
Railway stations served by Chiltern Railways
Railway station